The Exobasidiaceae are a family of fungi in the division Basidiomycota, order Exobasidiales. The family contains 5 genera and 56 species. Species in the family have a widespread distribution, especially in temperate areas. Members of the Exobasidiaceae are plant pathogens that grow on the leaves of plants, especially those in the family Ericaceae.

References

Ustilaginomycotina
Fungal plant pathogens and diseases
Basidiomycota families
Taxa named by Joseph Schröter